is a limited express train service operated in Japan by East Japan Railway Company (JR East) on the Jōban Line between Shinagawa Station / Ueno Station in Tokyo and Sendai Station in Miyagi Prefecture. The Tokiwa service follows the same route but makes additional stops.

History
The  name was taken from the former Hitachi Province (常陸), which is now part of the Ibaraki Prefecture.

The service was first introduced on 1 October 1963 for a semi-express service which operated daily between Ueno and Taira (present-day Iwaki) using 451 series EMU stock, will all cars reserved. This service operated until 30 September 1967.

The name was subsequently reintroduced on 1 October 1969 for a once-daily seasonal limited-express service operating between Ueno and Iwaki using 7-car KiHa 81 series diesel multiple units. This became a regular daily service the following year.

485 series EMUs were phased in from 2 October 1972, and were used until services were discontinued in December 1998. From 1 April 1973, one return service daily was extended to operate between Ueno and Sendai. From 1 October of the same year, the number of services to and from Sendai was increased to six return services. From 2 October 1978, this number was increased to 11 return services daily, to 12 from 15 November 1982, to 23 from 14 March 1985 with the discontinuation of the Tokiwa express, and to 26 return services daily from 1 November 1986.

During the 1990s, services were operated using Katsuta-based seven-car 485 series formations with no Green car accommodation. Fourteen-car formations were sometimes used.

The original Hitachi was discontinued from December 1998 with the withdrawal of the last 485 series electric multiple units (EMUs) on the Jōban Line, with the main daytime limited express services subsequently being named Super Hitachi and Fresh Hitachi.

From the start of the 14 March 2015 timetable revision, Super Hitachi services were renamed simply Hitachi, and Fresh Hitachi services were renamed Tokiwa. From the same date, services were extended south of Ueno via the new Ueno-Tokyo Line, with most services terminating at Shinagawa Station.

Future plans 
From the start of the 18 March 2023 timetable revision, all Hitachi services terminating at Ueno Station will be extended to Shinagawa Station.

Ticketing 
A supplementary ticket has to be purchased to board the train, along with the basic fare ticket.

The Reserved Seat Ticket enables a specified seat to be reserved for the holder. The reserved status for the seat is signified by a green overhead lamp on top of the corresponding seat.

The Unreserved Seat Ticket enables the holder to be seated on any unreserved seat. A red overhead lamp signifies that the seat is unreserved; while a yellow overhead lamp signifies that the seat is reserved for the later part of the journey, implying that one has to give up their seat to the passenger who has reserved the seat, when they board the train later.

Past services 
In the past, there were 2 limited express services that also bear the name Hitachi.

Super Hitachi
The  was introduced on 11 March 1989, operating between Ueno and Iwaki or Sendai, using new 651 series EMUs. It operated at a maximum speed of 130 km/h. Services are generally formed of 7-car or 7+4-car formations, with only the 4-car sets continuing north of Iwaki. It served as the faster limited express compared to the Fresh Hitachi (see below).

Trains operating between Iwaki and Sendai had discontinued, due to the 2011 Tohoku earthquake and tsunami, which caused severe damages at parts of the section. From that point on, Super Hitachi services only operated between Ueno and Iwaki.

From the start of the revised timetable on 17 March 2012, new E657 series EMUs were phased in on some Super Hitachi services, and entirely replaced the 651 series trains by the start of the revised timetable on 16 March 2013.

By the start of another timetable revision on 14 March 2015, Super Hitachi services have been renamed as the Hitachi, ending the Super Hitachi'''s 26-year service.

Fresh Hitachi
The  was introduced on 1 October 1997 between Ueno and Iwaki, using new E653 series EMUs. It operated at a maximum speed of 130 km/h. Services were initially formed of 7-car, 7+4-car, or 7+7-car E653 EMUs, as well as 7-car or 7+4-car 651 series EMUs. It served as the slower limited express compared to the Super Hitachi.

From the start of the revised timetable on 17 March 2012, new 10-car E657 series EMUs were introduced on Fresh Hitachi services, operating alongside existing 651 series and E653 series sets, and as of 16 March 2013, all services are operated using E657 series EMUs. During the period between 1 October 2013 and around March 2015, however, one up and one down Fresh Hitachi service daily will be operated by an 11-car 651 series formation covering while the E657 series fleet undergoes modification work to add LED seat reservation status indicators above each seat.

By the start of another timetable revision on 14 March 2015, Fresh Hitachi services have been renamed as the Tokiwa, ending the Fresh Hitachi's 18-year service.

Rolling stock

As of 16 March 2013, all services are operated by E657 series 10-car EMUs, first introduced from March 2012, although 11-car 651 series formations will be substituted on some services between 1 October 2013 and March 2015.

Past rolling stock
 451 series EMUs (Hitachi, October 1963 - 30 September 1967)
 KiHa 81 series DMUs (Hitachi, October 1963 - ?)
 485 series EMUs (Hitachi, 2 October 1972 - December 1998)
 651 series 4/7/11-car EMUs (Super Hitachi, Fresh Hitachi 11 March 1989 - 15 March 2013)
 E653 series 7/11/14-car EMUs (Fresh Hitachi'' since 1 October 1997 - 15 March 2013)

Formations
Trains are formed as shown below, with car 1 at the Ueno end. All cars are no smoking.

Hitachi 
All seats are reserved.

Past formations

Super Hitachi (Prior to 13 March 2015)

Fresh Hitachi (Prior to 13 March 2015)

See also
Tokiwa (train)
List of named passenger trains of Japan

References

External links

 JR East Hitachi and Tokiwa

Named passenger trains of Japan
East Japan Railway Company
Jōban Line
Railway services introduced in 1963
1963 establishments in Japan